Teulada (Latin: Tegula) is a comune (municipality) in the Province of South Sardinia in the Italian region Sardinia, located about  southwest of Cagliari.

The località of Sant'Isidoro di Teulada is one of the possible sites of the ancient Roman city of Bithia (also called Biotha and Biora).

The Battle of Cape Spartivento was a short World War II naval battle on 27 November 1940 when HMS Newcastle and three other British cruisers engaged and exchanged fire with a number of ships of the Italian navy.

Twin towns
 Teulada, Spain

References

External links

 Official website
 Inteulada.it

Cities and towns in Sardinia